Erythrina megistophylla is a species of legume in the family Fabaceae.
It is found only in Ecuador. Its natural habitats are subtropical or tropical moist lowland forests and subtropical or tropical moist montane forests.

References

Sources

megistophylla
Flora of Ecuador
Near threatened plants
Taxonomy articles created by Polbot